A maritime nation is any nation that borders the sea and is dependent on its use for the majority of the following state activities: commerce and transport, war, to define a territorial boundary, or for any maritime activity (activities using the sea to convey or produce an end result).

Historically, the term has been used to refer to a thalassocracy such as Carthage and Phoenicia but during the medieval period increasingly became associated with the Maritime Republics of Venice, Pisa, Genoa, Amalfi, Gaeta, Ancona and Ragusa

References

Water transport